SMS V46 was a 1913 Type Large Torpedo Boat (Großes Torpedoboot) of the Imperial German Navy during World War I, and the 22nd ship of her class.

Construction

Ordered from AG Vulcan on 22 April 1914 as part of the 1914 construction programme of high-seas torpedo-boats (with a half-flotilla of 6 ordered from Germaniawerft and a second half-flotilla from Vulcan), she was launched from AG Vulcan's Stettin, (now Szczecin in Poland) on 23 December 1914 and commissioned on 31 October 1915.  The "V" in V46 denoted  the shipbuilder who constructed her.

Armament originally consisted of three 8.8 cm SK L/45 naval guns in single mounts, together with six 50 cm (19.7 in) torpedo tubes with two fixed single tubes forward and 2 twin mounts aft. Up to 24 mines could be carried. The ship had a complement of 87 officers and men.

Service

V46 was assigned to the Sixth Torpedo Boat Flotilla, Twelfth Half-Flotilla, of the High Seas Fleet of the Imperial German Navy when she participated in the Battle of Jutland. None of the torpedoes from this attack, or one immediately afterwards from the 9th Flotilla, hit their targets. Later that evening, the 12th Half Flotilla was sent to the rear of the retiring German fleet, in order to carry out night torpedo attacks on the British fleet. They were fired on by the 2nd Light Cruiser Squadron at about 21:52 CET and turned away, with S50 being damaged by a British shell. V46 and V69 later returned to their search for the British battleships, but although they spotted flashes of the night battles, they encountered no British ships.

In January 1917, the 6th Flotilla was transferred to Flanders to reinforce the German torpedo boat forces based in the Belgian ports. The Flotilla set out from Helgoland for Flanders on 22 January, but decoding of German radio signals by Room 40 warned the British of the German intentions, and the Harwich Force of cruisers and destroyers sent to intercept the German torpedo boats. During the night of 22–23 January, the 6th Flotilla encountered three British light cruisers (and ). The remaining eight ships of the flotilla reached Zeebrugge unharmed on 23 January. On the night of 25/26 February, the Flanders-based torpedo boats launched a three-pronged attack against Allied shipping in the English Channel and the Dover Barrage. Six ships of the 6th Flotilla, including V46 were to attack the Dover Barrage, while other torpedo boats were to attack shipping on The Downs and off the mouth of the River Maas. The 6th Flotilla ran into the British destroyer  which was patrolling the Barrage. While the German ships attacked Laverock with heavy gunfire and torpedoes (one of which hit the British destroyer but failed to explode), the British destroyer only received light damage, and the 6th Flotilla turned back for Zeebrugge, with the drifters of the Dover Barrage unharmed. The Flanders-based flotillas attacked again on the night of 17/18 March. Seven torpedo boats of the 6th Flotilla (V45 and V46) were to attack the Dover Barrage north of the Sandettie Bank, with five torpedo boats of the 1st Zeebrugge Half-Flotilla attacking south of the Sandettie Bank, and four ships of the 2nd Zeebrugge Half-Flotilla operating against the Downs. The 6th Flotilla met the British destroyer  on crossing the Dover Barrage. Paragon challenged the German torpedo boats, which replied with gunfire and torpedoes, Paragon being struck by torpedoes from S49 and G46 and sunk. The 12th Half-Flotilla (including V46) became separated from the rest of the 6th Flotilla and therefore returned to base, while the remaining three ships of the flotilla continued on, torpedoing and badly damaging the destroyer  before returning to base, while a merchant ship was sunk by the 2nd Zeebrugge Half-Flotilla east of the Downs. The 6th Flotilla returned to Germany on 29 March 1917.

In October 1917, Germany launched Operation Albion, an invasion of islands in the West Estonian archipelago to secure the left flank of the German Army following the German capture of Riga. The Germans assembled a powerful naval force to support the operation, reinforced by forces detached from the High Seas Fleet, including the 6th Torpedo Boat Flotilla. V46 carried out operations in Tagga Bay in support of Operation Albion on 14 October.

After the end of hostilities, V46 was interned at Scapa Flow.  Attempts to scuttle her with the rest of the German fleet were unsuccessful.  She was transferred to France in 1920 and scrapped in 1924.

See also
German ocean-going torpedo boats of World War I

References

Bibliography

External links
 Technical specs of the Großes Torpedoboot 1913 class

Torpedo boats of the Imperial German Navy
1914 ships
Ships built in Stettin
World War I torpedo boats of Germany
World War I warships scuttled at Scapa Flow
Maritime incidents in 1919